Yuliya Olegovna Vasilyeva (September 6, 1978, Moscow, USSR) is a Russian Synchro-swimmer.

She has Olympic gold medal in team competition in 2000 and won two European Championships (1999, 2000).

She was a member of National team in 1998-2000,Now She Working In Special Olympics.

External links
 Yuliya Vasilyeva's profile 
 sports-reference.com

Russian synchronized swimmers
Olympic synchronized swimmers of Russia
Synchronized swimmers at the 2000 Summer Olympics
Olympic gold medalists for Russia
1978 births
Living people
Swimmers from Moscow
Olympic medalists in synchronized swimming
Medalists at the 2000 Summer Olympics